Manchester is a city in Northwest England.  The M22 postcode area of the city includes parts of the suburbs of Northenden and Wythenshawe.  This postcode area contains 15 listed buildings that are recorded in the National Heritage List for England.  Of these, three are listed at Grade II*, the middle of the three grades, and the others are at Grade II, the lowest grade.  The area is largely residential and most of the listed buildings are houses and churches and associated structures.  The other listed buildings include a bridge, a war memorial, and a former bus depot.


Key

Buildings

References

Citations

Sources

Lists of listed buildings in Greater Manchester
Buildings and structures in Manchester